Rógvi Poulsen is a Faroese footballer who currently plays for AB Argir. He has played four matches for the Faroe Islands national football team.

Career

AB Argir
He started his playing career at AB Argir and made his first-team debut as a 16-year-old on 18 March 2006 in the cup match against FS Vágar, which AB won 2–1. During the whole season, Poulsen made 20 appearances and scored 4 goals, the first in the 2–3 loss against FS Vágar on 14 May 2006. AB Argir finished second in 1. deild and were promoted to the Formuladeildin. 
In the 2007 season he made 27 appearances and scored 2 goals in total. AB finished ninth and were relegated back into 1.deild. In October 2012 he signed for AB Argir, he will come back to play with AB Argir after playing five years for HB Tórshavn.

HB Tórshavn
He signed for HB Tórshavn in 2008 and immediately became a first-team regular. He made his debut on 23 March in the 3–2 defeat to ÍF Fuglafjørður in the Faroe Islands Cup. The 2009 season, he helped HB win the Faroe Islands Super Cup and the league title, playing in 32 matches and scored 10 goals.
In the 2010 season he won the Super Cup and league with HB again.
In late 2010 he spent time on trial at English club Crewe Alexandra and featured in a 1-0 reserve-team defeat at Liverpool.
He then had a second trial at Crewe, who were examining the possibility of signing Poulsen on a short-term contract after impressing during a second trial.
But complications with international clearance and other red tape prevented the move.
Poulsen returned to HB in April 2011.

International career
He has represented his country at Under-17, U-19, and U-21 level, as well as capped at full international level for the Faroe Islands. He scored for the under-21 team in September 2009, in a European Under-21 Championship Qualifying match against Latvia with strike from long-range. He debuted for the senior team on 4 June 2010, in a friendly match against Luxembourg.

References

Faroese footballers
Faroe Islands international footballers
Argja Bóltfelag players
Havnar Bóltfelag players
1989 births
Living people
Faroe Islands under-21 international footballers
Association football midfielders
Faroe Islands youth international footballers